Vice Admiral Sir Michael Culme-Seymour, 4th Baronet  (29 August 1867 – 2 April 1925) was an officer of the Royal Navy. A member of a substantial naval dynasty, he served during the First World War, commanding a ship at the Battle of Jutland in 1916. He received a number of awards and decorations, and served as commander-in-chief of the Mediterranean Fleet during the inter-war period, and as Second Sea Lord. He inherited a baronetcy on the death of his father, but died shortly afterwards with the rank of vice-admiral.

Naval career
Culme-Seymour was born on 29 August 1867, eldest son of Captain Michael Culme-Seymour and Mary Georgiana Watson. He followed his father by embarking on a naval career, and was promoted to the rank of lieutenant on 23 August 1889. He was appointed in command of the destroyer HMS Coquette on 31 August 1900.

By the outbreak of the First World War he had risen to the rank of captain, and he commanded the battleship  as part of the 2nd Battle Squadron of the Grand Fleet, and fought at the Battle of Jutland in 1916. He was Mentioned in Despatches for his efforts, and was promoted to flag-rank later that year, becoming rear admiral.

Culme-Seymour spent the period between 1916 and 1918 as Director of Mobilization at the Admiralty. For his service during the war he received a number of foreign honours. He was made a member of the Russian Orders of Saint Stanislaus (1st Class) and the Order of St. Vladimir (4th Class with swords), the Japanese Order of the Rising Sun (2nd Class), the French Légion d'honneur and a Grand Commander of the Greek Order of the Redeemer.

With the end of the war Culme-Seymour between 1 January 1919 and 1 September 1920 he simultaneously was appointed and held the posts of 
Rear-Admiral Commanding, 4th Battle Squadron. The same month he was Rear-Admiral Commanding the Black Sea and Caspian Squadron that was a detachment of the 4th Battle Squadron. He was appointed Commander-in-Chief, Eastern Mediterranean Squadron (May–September 1919), with promotion to vice admiral on 7 October 1920. In 1920 he was appointed Second-in-Command, Mediterranean Fleet. The death of his father that year led to his succession as 4th Baronet Seymour, of High Mount. He then became Commander-in-Chief of the North America and West Indies Station between 1923 and 1924, after which he became Second Sea Lord. He died on 2 April 1925.

Family
He had married Florence Nugent in 1896, and was survived by his wife and their son and daughter. The son, Michael, inherited the baronetcy and went on to serve in the navy during the Second World War.

References

External links

|-

1867 births
1925 deaths
Michael Seymour
Lords of the Admiralty
Royal Navy vice admirals
Royal Navy admirals of World War I
Royal Navy officers of World War I
Baronets in the Baronetage of the United Kingdom
Knights Commander of the Order of the Bath
Commandeurs of the Légion d'honneur
Members of the Royal Victorian Order
Recipients of the Order of St. Vladimir, 4th class
Recipients of the Order of the Rising Sun, 2nd class
Recipients of the Order of Saint Stanislaus (Russian), 1st class